Scheppach may refer to:
Scheppach (company), German manufacturer of cement mixers and other machinery
Scheppach (Bretzfeld), village within Bretzfeld, Hohenlohe district, Baden-Württemberg, Germany